The 1962 All England Championships was a badminton tournament held at Wembley, London, England, from 21–24 March 1962.

Final results

Men's singles

Section 1

Section 2

Women's singles

Section 1

Section 2

References

All England Open Badminton Championships
All England
All England Open Badminton Championships in London
All England Badminton Championships
All England Badminton Championships
All England Badminton Championships